RWE Supply & Trading CZ is the largest natural gas trading company in the Czech Republic. It is owned by the German energy company RWE.

The group used to own pipelines from Lanžhot on Czech-Slovak border to Germany. Its market position deteriorated in 1997 when the competing Yamal-Europe pipeline was put into operation. Another threat was the Nord Stream 1 linking Russia and Germany via Baltic sea. Its past subsidiaries included RWE Gas Storage (owns and operates several underground storages located in the Czech Republic). In December 2021, RWE put the gas storage business up for sale.

See also

 Energy in the Czech Republic

References

External links

Oil and gas companies of the Czech Republic
Supply